Dickie Davis may refer to:

 Dickie Davis (footballer) (1922–1999), English footballer who played for Sunderland and Darlington
 Dickie Davis (British Army officer) (born 1962), British general
 Dickie Davis (cricketer) (1966–2003), English cricketer

See also
 Dickie Davies (1928–2023), British television presenter
 Dick Davis (disambiguation)
 Richard Davis (disambiguation)